Germán Ezequiel Cano Recalde (born 2 January 1988) is an Argentine professional footballer who plays as a striker for Fluminense.

Club career

Lanús and loans
Born in Posadas, Misiones, Cano was a Lanús youth graduate. He made his first team debut on 13 February 2008, coming on as a late substitute for Lautaro Acosta in a 3–1 Copa Libertadores home win against Danubio.

Cano made his Primera División debut on 17 February 2008, starting in a 1–0 away loss against Huracán. On 29 March, he scored his first professional goal by netting his team's only in a 3–1 loss at San Lorenzo, and finished his first senior season with two goals in 11 appearances.

On 21 August 2009, Cano was loaned to newly-promoted side Chacarita Juniors, for one year. After featuring sparingly but suffering relegation he returned to Lanús, but after being rarely used by the latter, he was loaned out to Colón on 30 December 2010.

On 26 July 2011, Cano moved abroad for the first time in his career, joining Categoría Primera A side Deportivo Pereira on loan until December. The following 31 January, he moved to Paraguay's Nacional also in a temporary deal.

Independiente Medellín
On 5 July 2012, Cano agreed to a permanent contract with Independiente Medellín. He was an immediate starter for the club, scoring nine goals in his first season and 15 goals in his second.

In the 2014 campaign, Cano scored 27 goals and was the top goalscorer of the Clausura tournament; highlights included a hat-trick in a 4–1 away routing of Millonarios on 11 October.

Pachuca and loans
On 21 January 2015, Cano switched teams and countries again after agreeing to a contract with Liga MX side Pachuca. He made his debut for the club on 1 February, starting in a 1–0 loss at Guadalajara, and scored his first goal on 4 March in a 1–1 CONCACAF Champions League away draw against Montreal Impact.

On 11 December 2015, after failing to feature in any league matches during the first half of the campaign due to a knee injury, Cano was loaned to fellow league team León. After being a regular starter, he returned to Pachuca and was mainly utilized as a substitute.

On 10 January 2018, Cano returned to Independiente Medellín on an initial six-month loan deal. On 19 May, he extended his link until the end of the year, and ended the season with 32 goals overall.

Vasco da Gama
On 27 December 2019, Germán Cano was announced as Cruzmaltino's first reinforcement for 2020. In his second match for Vasco da Gama, Cano scored his first goal with the cruzmaltina shirt, in the last move of the victory over Boavista 1–0.

On 6 December 2021, his departure from Vasco da Gama was announced. In all, Cano played in 101 games and provided four assists and scored 43 goals. He is the club's second-highest foreign goalscorer in the 21st century and 2nd among foreigners.

Fluminense
On 27 December, Cano signed with Fluminense, with a contract until 2023.

On 26 May 2022 he scored his first hat-trick in the historic 10–1 defeat of Oriente Petrolero, a match valid for the last round of the Copa Sudamericana.

At the end of the 2022 season, Germán Cano was the top scorer of the Campeonato Brasileiro Série A 2022 with 26 goals. Also in the 2022 season with the tricolor shirt, Cano was the top scorer of the Copa do Brasil with 5 goals. In all in the 2022 season he scored 44 goals.

Career statistics

Honours
Lanus
Argentine Primera División: 2007–08 (Apertura)

Independiente Medellín
Copa Colombia: 2019

Vasco da Gama
 Taça Rio: 2021

Fluminense
 Taça Guanabara: 2022, 2023 
 Campeonato Carioca: 2022

Individual
Bola de Prata: 2022
Campeonato Brasileiro Série A Team of the Year: 2022

References

External links
 
 
 

1988 births
Living people
People from Posadas, Misiones
Argentine footballers
Association football forwards
Argentine Primera División players
Club Atlético Lanús footballers
Chacarita Juniors footballers
Club Atlético Colón footballers
Categoría Primera A players
Deportivo Pereira footballers
Independiente Medellín footballers
Paraguayan Primera División players
Club Nacional footballers
Liga MX players
C.F. Pachuca players
Club León footballers
CR Vasco da Gama players
Fluminense FC players
Campeonato Brasileiro Série A players
Campeonato Brasileiro Série B players
Argentine expatriate footballers
Argentine expatriate sportspeople in Colombia
Argentine expatriate sportspeople in Paraguay
Argentine expatriate sportspeople in Mexico
Argentine expatriate sportspeople in Brazil
Expatriate footballers in Colombia
Expatriate footballers in Paraguay
Expatriate footballers in Mexico
Expatriate footballers in Brazil
Sportspeople from Misiones Province